Manhattan Knights is a 1928 American silent drama film directed by Burton L. King and starring Barbara Bedford, Walter Miller and Crauford Kent.

When her brother loses fifty thousand dollars playing cards to three shady characters, Margaret attempts to recover the cheque he gave them which he can't afford to meet.

Cast
 Barbara Bedford as Margaret
 Walter Miller as Robert Ferris
 Betty Worth as Julia
 Ray Hallor as James Barton
 Crauford Kent as Henry Ryder
 Eddie Boland as Chick Watson
 Noble Johnson as Doc Mellis
 Joseph Burke as Barry
 Leo White as Giuseppi

References

Bibliography
 Munden, Kenneth White. The American Film Institute Catalog of Motion Pictures Produced in the United States, Part 1. University of California Press, 1997.

External links
 

1928 films
1928 drama films
1920s English-language films
American silent feature films
Silent American drama films
American black-and-white films
Films directed by Burton L. King
1920s American films